Something to Talk About is the twentieth studio album by Canadian country pop artist Anne Murray. It was released by Capitol Records in 1986. The album is so named after the Shirley Eikhard-composed song "Something to Talk About", which Murray had wanted to record for the album but was rejected by her producers; Bonnie Raitt went on to have a huge hit with the song.

The album peaked at #2 for several weeks on the Billboard Top Country Albums chart - Anne's highest position.  The disc was certified Gold by the RIAA.

Track listing

Personnel 
 Anne Murray – lead vocals 
 David Foster – keyboards (1), synthesizers (1)
 Ed Arkin – keyboards (2-6, 10), synthesizers (2-6, 10), programming (2-6, 10), bass (2-6, 10), electronic drums (2-6, 10)
 Michael Boddicker – keyboards (2-6, 10), synthesizers (2-6, 10), programming (2-6, 10), bass (2-6, 10), electronic drums (2-6, 10)
 Harold Faltermeyer – keyboards (2-6, 10), synthesizers (2-6, 10), programming (2-6, 10), bass (2-6, 10), electronic drums (2-6, 10)
 Mark Spiro – keyboards (2-6, 10), synthesizers (2-6, 10), programming (2-6, 10), bass (2-6, 10), electronic drums (2-6, 10), backing vocals (2-6, 10)
 Bo Tomlyn – keyboards (2-6, 10), synthesizers (2-6, 10), programming (2-6, 10), bass (2-6, 10), electronic drums (2-6, 10)
 Uve Schikora – keyboards (2-6, 10), synthesizers (2-6, 10), programming (2-6, 10), bass (2-6, 10), electronic drums (2-6, 10)
 Kristian Schultze – keyboards (2-6, 10), synthesizers (2-6, 10), programming (2-6, 10), bass (2-6, 10), electronic drums (2-6, 10)
 Tom Henley – acoustic piano (4)
 Skip Anderson – keyboards (7, 8, 9), acoustic piano (7, 8, 9)
 Oscar Brown – keyboards (7, 8, 9)
 Keith Diamond – synthesizers (7, 8, 9), programming (7, 8, 9), bass (7, 8, 9), electronic drums (7, 8, 9)
 Michael Landau – guitars (1-6, 10)
 Bob Mann – guitars (1)
 Russ Freeman – guitars (2-6, 10)
 Dann Huff – guitars (2-6, 10)
 Ronny Drayton – guitars (7, 8, 9)
 Paul Pesco – guitars (7, 8, 9)
 Bob Rosa – drums (7, 8, 9)
 Terry Silverlight – drums (7, 8, 9)
 Brian Malouf – percussion (2-6, 10)
 Gary Herbeck – saxophone solos (2-6, 10)
 Larry Williams – saxophones (2-6, 10), sax solos (2-6, 10)
 Lew McCreary – trombone (2-6, 10)
 Chuck Findley – trumpet (2-6, 10)
 Jerry Hey – trumpet (2-6, 10)
 Richard Page – backing vocals (1-6, 10)
 Jill Colucci – backing vocals (2-6, 10)
 Cindy Fee – backing vocals (2-6, 10)
 Steve George – backing vocals (2-6, 10)
 Jim Haas – backing vocals (2-6, 10)
 John Joyce – backing vocals (2-6, 10)
 Tom Kelly – backing vocals (2-6, 10)
 Edie Lehmann – backing vocals (2-6, 10)
 Joe Pizzulo – backing vocals (2-6, 10)
 Andrea Robinson – backing vocals (2-6, 10)
 Cliff Dawson – backing vocals (7, 8, 9)
 Jill Dell'Abate – backing vocals (7, 8, 9)
 Curtis King – backing vocals (7, 8, 9)
 Yvonne Lewis – backing vocals (7, 8, 9)
 Cindy Mizelll – backing vocals (7, 8, 9)
 Sandy Pandya – backing vocals (7, 8, 9)

Charts

Weekly charts

Year-end charts

References

1986 albums
Anne Murray albums
Capitol Records albums
Albums produced by David Foster
Albums produced by Jack White (music producer)